The Iraqi Republican Assembly is one of the electoral coalitions that participated in the January 30, 2005 National Assembly election in Iraq.

In the Iraqi legislative election, 2005, the Iraqi Republican Assembly received 15,452 votes, or 0.18% of the ballot.

Political parties in Iraq